Grudno  is a village in the administrative district of Gmina Bolków, within Jawor County, Lower Silesian Voivodeship, in south-western Poland.

The village has a population of 76.

Gallery

References

Grudno